Kokhav Nolad 6 was the 6th season of the popular reality TV show Kokhav Nolad, which focused on finding the next Israeli pop star. It was hosted by Tzvika Hadar with judges Gal Uchovsky, Margalit Tzan'ani, Svika Pik, and Tsedi Tzarfati.

Participants

Male participants
Israel Bar-On (born January 31, 1989) from Beersheba.
Lee Biran also nicknamed Libi (born December 16, 1989) from Kfar Saba.
Aviv Meshulam (born August 15, 1990) from Neta'im. Was (eliminated), got (save) but was (eliminated)
Rotem Katz (born May 21, 1990) from Akko. (eliminated)
Matan Kauffman (born 1990) from Kfar Saba.  (eliminated)
Ben Tzuk (born September 14, 1980) from Amuka. (eliminated)
Oz Tzechovoy (born April 14, 1988) from Zikhron Ya'akov. (eliminated)
Sagi Trabelsi (born August 5, 1989) from Rishon LeZion. (eliminated)
Alex Krul (born September 26, 1989) from Kiryat Motzkin. (eliminated)

Female participants

Carmel Eckman (born March 3, 1988) from  Bar'am.
Ma'ayan Hajbi (born August 2, 1991) from Yakhini. (eliminated)
Adi Avishay (born November 21, 1985) from Kfar Saba. (eliminated)
Birgitta Växler (born September 20, 1990) from Mevaseret Zion. (eliminated)
Sisters G (Orly Guetta & Shuli Guy) (born July 15, 1986 and August 22, 1986) from Netanya. Was (eliminated), got (save) but was (eliminated)
Bat-Hen Hakyia (born May 4, 1984) from Tel Mond. (eliminated)
Tair Gamliel (born July 14, 1978) from Rehovot. (eliminated)
Daniel Kri'ef (born February 12, 1991) from Shtulim. (eliminated)
Michale Jakubowicz (born January 16, 1985) from Kfar Saba. (eliminated)
Moran Shmueli (born January 17, 1986) from Ein Vered. (eliminated)

First Solo Show - June 30

The first show was held on June 30, again, held in Herzliyya. These were the participants of the first show, and their entries, and also the original performer of the song.

During the show, the 19 participants sang also "Akshav Hakol Beseder", originally by Yehudit Ravitz. The first participant to leave the show was Moran Shmueli, who almost participated in Kokhav Nolad 5.

Second Solo Show - July 1

Third Solo Show - July 6

Bat-Hen and Daniel were the bottom two performers. They had to wait for the second day, where they would meet that day's bottom two and wait for the judges' results to decide the qualifier(s) for the next stage.

Fourth Solo Show - July 7

The bottom two were Sagi Trabelsi and Michale Jakubowicz. The judges could save up to two participants, but three judges voted for Bat-Hen, and only one judge voted for Michale. Therefore, Michale, Sagi and Daniel were eliminated.

First Duet Show - July 13

The bottom two pairs were Ma'ayan Hajbi and Oz Tzechovoy and Sisters G and Ben Tzuk. Each had the chance to sing solos and voting was opened again. In the end, Sisters G was eliminated.

Fifth Solo Show - July 14
This show had a theme of children's songs.

Second Duet Show - July 20

The bottom three pairs were Bat-Hen Hakyia and Rotem Katz, Adi Avishay and Ben Tzuk, and Matan Kauffman and Oz Tzechovoy. Each participant sang a solo song and voting was opened again. Ben Tzuk and Oz Tzechovoy were eliminated.

Sixth Solo Show - July 21
This show had a theme of songs written by Yitzhak Klepter.

Third Duet Show - July 27

The bottom two pairs were Bat-Hen Hakyia and Carmel Eckman and Adi Avishay and Birgitta Växler. For the solo section, Sisters G and Aviv Meshulam made a surprise return along to participate. After voting was done, Bat-Hen Hakyia was eliminated.

Sixth Solo Show - July 28
This show had a theme of songs written by Yehudit Ravitz.

Seventh Solo Show - August 3
This show had a theme of Hebrew songs with Greek origin (this style is also called "Yam Hatikhon" - Mediterranean Sea

Eighth Solo Show - August 4
This show had a theme of songs written by Ivri Lider.

Fourth Duet Show - August 10

In this round only performers of the best duet passed to next day, it means, that Adi, Ma'ayan, Libi and Carmel all sang solos and the voting was opened again and finally, Adi Avishay was eliminated.

As a special host, performered in this round Keren Peles her new single "Peugeot ´92"

Ninth Solo Show - August 11
This show had a theme of songs written by Shlomo Artzi.

Live shows

See also
American Idol

Kokhav Nolad seasons
2008 in Israel
2008 in music
2008 Israeli television seasons